Francisco J. Domenech (born April 29, 1978 in San Juan, Puerto Rico) is a former Director of the Office of Legislative Services of Puerto Rico (2005–2008). Domenech spent part of his childhood, and adolescent years, in Ocala, Florida, having attended Blessed Trinity Catholic School, and Forest High School.

DNC Superdelegate and Democratic Party Conventions 
Domenech has been a delegate to Democratic National Convention in 2004, 2008, 2012, and 2016.  By virtue of the position he held for more than five (5) years in the Democratic National Committee, representing the Young Democrats of America (YDA), as their Democratic National Committeeman, he was a Superdelegate to the 2008  and 2012 Conventions.  During the 2004 Convention, Domenech served as one of the whips for the Puerto Rico Delegation.  During the 2016 Puerto Rico Democratic primary campaign, Domenech was Hillary Clinton's top fundraiser in the U.S. territory and attended his fourth consecutive Democratic National Convention, after being elected as a Delegate representing his Bayamón Senatorial District.

Politics 

In the political sphere, Domenech, is a supporter of admitting Puerto Rico as the 51st state of the United States. In May 2003 he became President of the Puerto Rico Young Democrats (PRYD).  During his tenure as President of the PRYD's, Domenech led a team of 14 young Puerto Rican professionals in Central Florida that campaigned for several weeks for the Kerry/Edwards ticket.  He also volunteered extensively during 2003–2004 in former Gov. Pedro Rosselló's gubernatorial campaign, both in island wide political organizing, as well as platform and opposition research activities.  In November 2004, Domenech also organized and hosted YDA's Fall National meeting in San Juan, Puerto Rico. Domenech then was elected as a national officer of YDA in 2005 as Vice President for Development and on July 21, 2007 became a member of the DNC, when YDA's national convention elected him as its Democratic National Committeeman.  In 2010 he was reelected for his third and last term as YDA's Democratic National Committeeman, before he aged out of the youth organization.  During the last years of his active participation in YDA, Domenech was a co-founder of the YDA Hispanic Caucus. Domenech is the only person in the history of the Young Democrats of America to have served as a national officer for seven (7) consecutive years, two (2) years as a Vice President and five years (5) as Democratic National Committeeman.

Following in the footsteps of many Democratic leaders, such as the young Hillary Clinton who registered Hispanics in Southwest Texas in the 70's, Domenech led voter registration drives aimed at potential Puerto Rican voters in Florida's I-4 Corridor in several election cycles between 2004 and 2010, staffed by YDA Puerto Rico chapter volunteers.

In December 2007, Domenech was appointed by Senator Hillary Clinton to Co-Chair her presidential campaign's Hillblazers, a national network of young professionals and students.  He also served as Deputy State Coordinator of Sen. Clinton's successful primary campaign in Puerto Rico, where she polled a 68–32 margin over Sen. Obama in the June 1, 2008 Puerto Rico Democratic primary, 2008.

Domenech served as one of the national co-finance chairs of Ready for Hillary, and coordinated fundraisers for the super PAC in and out of Puerto Rico, from California to Washington, DC. He served on the National Finance Committee for Hillary Clinton presidential campaign, 2016, was her top fundraising bundler from Puerto Rico, assisted in organizing her first campaign trip to Puerto Rico in the current election cycle, which took place on September 4, 2015. He additionally served as the campaign manager for her successful primary camping in Puerto Rico, where she polled a 61–37, margin of victory over Sen. Sanders in the June 5, 2016 Puerto Rico Democratic primary, 2016.

Domenech also served as Representative Jenniffer Gonzalez campaign manager during her historic run to become the first woman to hold the Resident Commissioner of Puerto Rico seat in Washington, D.C. On November 8, 2016, and after 14 months of campaigning, Domenech successfully led a campaign team that made history by electing the first woman and youngest person to represent Puerto Rico in the U.S. Congress. During the 2019-2020 election cycle, which redefined all the rules for running a campaign due to the impact of COVID-19 Mr. Domenech once again served as Congresswoman González's campaign manager for her re-election bid to another four (4) year term as Puerto Rico's Resident Commissioner in Congress. Ms. González comfortably defeated her four (4) opponents, winning her re-election by 41.18% of the vote, with a 9% lead over closest opponent. She also achieved the most votes out of any candidates running for any elected office on the Island.

Professional background 
While practicing law at the age of 27, Domenech argued on behalf of the Puerto Rico Senate before a relatively rare en banc hearing of the United States Court of Appeals for the First Circuit in the case of Igartúa De La Rosa v. United States of America. He has also appeared before Puerto Rico's Supreme Court, as well as its Court of Appeals.

In 2005 he was appointed jointly by Senate of Puerto Rico President Kenneth McClintock and Puerto Rico House of Representatives Speaker José Aponte as Director of the Office of Legislative Services of Puerto Rico.the local legislative equivalent of the United States Congress' Congressional Research Service with a staff of about 120 and a budget of $10 million.  During his tenure, he streamlined the staff, expanded the Office's Tomás Bonilla Legislative Library, including access to the blind and the physically handicapped, operated a 100-intern Summer program three years in a row, and turned budget surpluses during four consecutive fiscal years.

In early 2013, the Puerto Rico Supreme Court in Domenech Fernández v. Integration Corporate Services, et al ruled unanimously in his favor in a case arising from a shareholders' dispute within the firm for which he had previously worked.  In the Supreme Court's Opinion, in which the Court for the first time interprets Puerto Rico's 2009 Corporations Law, it ruled that whenever fraud or irregularities are alleged in the keeping of a corporation's records, as Domenech alleged, evidence extraneous to the corporate records will be admitted.

Since 2010, he founded and has led a bipartisan government affairs firm in Puerto Rico, Politank*, which hired Puerto Rico's former Secretary of State and Senate President Kenneth McClintock and Guillermo San Antonio-Acha, former Legal Counsel to the Governor during Governor Aníbal Acevedo Vilá's administration and who served from late 2014 until early 2017 as the Popular Democratic Party of Puerto Rico (PPD) Electoral Commissioner.

He has managed three (3) successful presidential campaigns within the Puerto Rico Physicians Association, the statutorily-created organization to which the islands' approximately 11,000 physicians mandatorily belong, to elect in 2014, reelect in 2016, and again reelect in 2018 the organization's current president, Dr. Víctor Ramos.  The reelection of Ramos on April 10, 2016 resulted in a majority of 71.6% in a three-way race. The third re-election of Dr. Ramos, led by Domenech, took place on April 22, 2018, by another comfortable margin of 67%  of all the votes cast. It was an even more historical feat than his two prior victories led by Domenech, because in the 25 years of the Colegio Médico's existence, no one candidate had ever been elected three (3) times to its presidency.

Mr. Domenech is a regular commentator in Puerto Rico media such as El Nuevo Día, El Vocero, Puerto Rico TV (Channel 6), Wapa America (Channel 4), Caribbean Business. Mr. Domenech is also frequently quoted in Puerto Rico's main media outlets.

Philanthropy 

Both individually and through his lobbying firm Politank*, Mr. Domenech has actively supported through the years various philanthropic endeavors.  These include:
Clinton Foundation
Congressional Hispanic Caucus Institute 
Museum of Art of Puerto Rico
Museo de Arte de Ponce
The Washington Center for Internships and Academic Seminars
Hispanic Heritage Foundation the TASIS Dorado Scholarship Fund  Puerto Rico Food Bank Fundación Fondo de Acceso a la Justicia Inc Rabito Kontento Santuario de Animales San Francisco de Asis

Education
A twice graduate of the University of Puerto Rico, Río Piedras campus, (UPR) first in 1999 when he obtained his Bachelor of Arts degree in Political Science, and then in 2003 when he obtained his Juris Doctor degree from the University of Puerto Rico School of Law. During his years at UPR, Domenech was President of the General Student Body Council during the 1999–2000 academic year, a position that had never been held by a statehooder before or since him. During that same year he also served as an Academic Senator before the UPR Río Piedras campus Academic Senate.  Prior to that, from 1998 to 1999, Domenech was UPR's College of Social Sciences Student Body President.

Academically, Domenech was a twice participant (2002 & 2003) in the international rounds of the Philip C. Jessup International Law Moot Court Competition on behalf of UPR's School of Law.  He ranked in the top 15% of oralists.

Family

He is the great grand nephew of Manuel V. Domenech, an engineer, who was a member of the first Puerto Rico House of Representatives after the Spanish–American War of 1898, and was reelected in 1902 and 1904. During 1904 he served as Mayor for the city of Ponce, Puerto Rico.  In 1914 he was appointed to serve as Commissioner of the Interior, becoming one of the first Puerto Ricans to hold an officer's position in the Cabinet which was appointed by the President of the United States. Also, he was later appointed as Treasurer of Puerto Rico serving in this capacity from 1930–1935. Unlike his great grand nephew, Manuel Domenech was a very active member of the Republican Party of Puerto Rico attending the 1928 Republican National Convention as an alternate delegate.

Domenech is also second cousin of the former Commonwealth of Virginia's Secretary of Natural Resources, Douglas Domenech who served in the Bush Administration as Deputy Chief of Staff for the United States Department of the Interior and who also served as Assistant Secretary for Insular Affairs of the United States Department of the Interior under the Trump Administration.

References

External links
Francisco J. Domenech, Esq.

1978 births
Living people
People from San Juan, Puerto Rico
21st-century Puerto Rican lawyers
21st-century Puerto Rican politicians
University of Puerto Rico alumni